Girl Overboard is a lost 1929 film part-sound part-silent, directed by Wesley Ruggles and starring Mary Philbin. It was distributed by Universal Pictures.

Also known under the titles of "Salvage" and "Port of Dreams".

Cast
Mary Philbin - Joan
Fred Mackaye - Denton Ford Jr.
Otis Harlan - Joe Evans
Francis McDonald - Francisco
Edmund Breese - Jim Keefe
Wilfrid North - Judge
Mary Alden

References

External links
Girl Overboard at Imdb.com

1929 films
Lost American films
Films directed by Wesley Ruggles
Universal Pictures films
1929 romantic drama films
American black-and-white films
1929 lost films